Oliver Twist is an outdoor 1976 bronze sculpture by Trace Guthrie, installed in Hermann Park's Miller Outdoor Theatre, Houston, in the U.S. state of Texas. The statue, cast at the Al Shakis Foundry, was donated to the city by Theatre Under the Stars in 1976.

See also

 1976 in art
 List of public art in Houston

References

1976 sculptures
Bronze sculptures in Texas
Outdoor sculptures in Houston
Sculptures of children in the United States
Statues in Texas
Hermann Park